Perrier is a brand of bottled mineral water.

Perrier may also refer to:

People 
 Bridget Perrier (born 1977), Canadian anti-prostitution activist
 Carlo Perrier (1886–1948), Italian mineralogist
 Denise Perrier (born 1935), French beauty queen
 Edmond Perrier (1844–1921), French zoologist 
 Florent Perrier (born 1973), French ski mountaineer
 François Perrier (painter) (1590– 1650), French painter
 François Perrier (French Army officer) (1835–1888), French geodesist
  François Perrier (1922–1990), French psychoanalyst
 Joseph Marie Henry Alfred Perrier de la Bâthie (1873–1958), French botanist
 Marcel Germain Perrier (1933–2017), French Roman Catholic bishop
 Marie-Jacques Perrier (1924– 2012), French singer, fashion journalist and author
 Mireille Perrier (born 1959), French actress
 Sébastien Perrier (born 1987), French ski mountaineer

Other uses
 Perrier à boîte, a type of small breech-loading cannon
 Perrier noir, a French wine grape that is also known as Mornen noir
 Perrier, Puy-de-Dôme, a commune of the Puy-de-Dôme département, France
 Perrier, a traction (man-powered) trebuchet
 Edinburgh Comedy Awards, an award formerly known as Perrier, presented at the Edinburgh Festival Fringe

French-language surnames